Ek Aadmi is 1988 Hindi language movie directed by Khwaja Ahmad Abbas, starring Shabana Azmi, Parikshat Sahni and Tun Tun.

External links 
 

1988 films
1980s Hindi-language films
Films directed by K. A. Abbas